Sudamerlycaste dyeriana is an orchid endemic to Peru and Ecuador. It is one of the very few insect-pollinated flowers (and the only orchid) which is entirely green in color. Other Sudamerlycaste species, such as Sudamerlycaste locusta are mostly green, but have white markings.

References

Maxillariinae